Xinbei District, alternatively called the New District or the High-tech Development Zone, is one of five district under the jurisdiction of Changzhou in Jiangsu province of China. The local language is the Changzhou dialect of Wu Chinese. In 2005 the total population was recorded at 480,000 people. The postal code for the district is 213161.

The district was established in August 1992 by the regional government as a high-tech manufacturing area. Businesses in the region also receive some preferential policies granted by the local government.

. As a result, a number of foreign styled restaurants and bars have been able to establish themselves, catering mostly to the expatriate community.

Xinbei is also home to the Changzhou campus of Hohai University, Changzhou Trina International School, and the Changzhou International School.

The theme park, China Dinosaur Park which was built in 2000 is also located in Xinbei District. It is ranked number 11 in Asian theme parks. The Changzhou municipal government was also moved to Xinbei. As well as many important high schools such as Beijiao High School. Xinbei one of the most developed districts in Changzhou city.

Administrative divisions
In the present, Xinbei District has 3 subdistricts and 6 towns.
3 subdistricts
 Hehai
 Sanjing
 Longhutang

6 towns

See also
Zhongguancun

References

External links
Official site of the Xinbei district government (Chinese & English)

County-level divisions of Jiangsu
Changzhou